The Dhanbad liquor tragedy involved the deaths of 254 people in Dhanbad (then in Bihar state) of India in December 1978 after drinking tainted bootleg liquor.

See also 
 List of alcohol poisonings in India

References

1978 in India
Alcohol-related deaths in India
Dhanbad
History of Jharkhand (1947–present)
Crime in Jharkhand